Summit Lake Provincial Park is a Class C provincial park located southeast of the community of Summit Lake in the Central Kootenay region of British Columbia, Canada.

Geography
The park sits atop a small peninsula located on the western shore of Summit Lake. The lake is surrounded by the Nakusp Range of the Selkirk Mountains, which rises 500 metres above the lake.

Recreation
Park visitors can enjoy fishing for rainbow and cutthroat trout or swimming in the lake's clear, refreshing mountain water. Mountain Goats can often be viewed on rocky outcroppings and each fall a natural spectacle occurs as thousands of toads emerge from the lake and migrate to the nearby forest to hibernate for the winter.

References

External links

Provincial parks of British Columbia
Regional District of Central Kootenay
Arrow Lakes
Protected areas established in 1964
1964 establishments in British Columbia